"The Desperate Drive of Corporal Jones" is the fifth episode of the fifth series of the British comedy series Dad's Army. It was originally transmitted on 3 November 1972.

Synopsis
The platoon, during the course of a weekend exercise, occupies a deserted barn to be denied to the enemy. As Mainwaring inspects the parade, Jones answers a phonecall from Colonel Pritchard who gives him the 6-digit map reference '937641'. Unfortunately after writing down the first 3 digits, Jones' pencil snaps so he goes in search of a spare. Whilst he's gone, Godfrey answers the phone and writes down the last 3 digits, but puts them in the wrong place so the reference reads 641937. Arriving at the barn a few miles from their destination, Jones' van breaks down, so Mainwaring leaves Jones and Godfrey to guard the vehicles (and also to keep Jones away from the live ammunition) whilst the rest march on.

When Jones rings the exercise HQ to inform them the platoon has arrived, he is told he has got the wrong reference, which turns out to be the target for some 25-pounder artillery guns. Jones signs off laughing that he must have read the numbers wrong, but Godfrey assures him that 641937 is definitely where Captain Mainwaring went. Jones and Godfrey try phoning to stop the firing, but Godfrey has cut the telephone wire by accident. There is only one solution: Jones will have to reach the barn before it's blown to bits.

Radio episode

Notes
The reason why Harold Snoad and Michael Knowles changed the name of the TV episode for radio was because the name "A Question of Reference" (referring to the map reference) meant a bit more than "The Desperate Drive of Corporal Jones".

Cast

References

Further reading

External links

    

Dad's Army (series 5) episodes
1972 British television episodes